Hošťálek is a Czech surname. Notable people with this surname include:

 :cs:Antonín Hošťálek (born 1950), Czech journalist
 Maxmilián Hošťálek (1564–1621), Czech mayor, executed
 Ondřej Hošťálek (born 1991), Czech ice hockey player

Czech-language surnames